Mary Emma Ebsworth (2 September 1794 – 13 October 1881) was an English dramatist.

Life
Ebsworth was the daughter of Robert Fairbrother, member of the Glovers' Company, and in later years a pantomimist and fencing-master, was born in London. Her father was an affectionate friend of Richard Brinsley Sheridan, and though he had lost several thousand pounds by him would never permit one word to be spoken in his disparagement. He was also the schoolmate and lifelong friend of Mrs. Jordan; great efforts were made to induce him to surrender her letters, many from the Duke of Clarence; but he indignantly refused any bribe, and himself destroyed all his papers, lest his descendants might be tempted.

Under the avowed signature of 'Sheridonicus' he wrote some papers in 'Thalia's Tablet, or Melpomene's Memorandum Book,’ of which No. 1 was published on Saturday, 8 December 1821. Fairbrother married Mary Bailey, who had been brought up in a nunnery at St. Omer. One of their sons, Samuel Glover Fairbrother, became a well-known theatrical publisher; another son, Benjamin Smith Fairbrother, who died on 28 August 1878, aged 76, was prompter, stage manager, and treasurer in succession at the chief theatres in London.

Work
French was so habitually spoken and read by Mrs. Fairbrother in the early days of her married life that her daughter, Mary Emma, turned to translating books for the publishers, one of these being a romance of 'Masaniello.' On 22 June 1817 she was married to Joseph Ebsworth, and lived at 3 Gray's Walk, Lambeth, where five of their ten children were born, the eldest being Emilie Marguerite, born in 1818, afterwards wife of Samuel H. Cowell, comedian. Before December 1826 she went to Edinburgh. She was closely associated in dramatic composition and translations with her husband; but several of her independent works were published in John Cumberland's acting drama: 'Payable at Sight; or the Chaste Salute,’ acted at the Surrey Theatre, &c.; 'The Two Brothers of Pisa,’ with music by T. Hughes, at the Royal Coburg, printed 1828; 'Ass's Skin;’ and, among many others, perhaps her best work, often acted, 'The Sculptor of Florence.' She was of a most retiring and unselfish nature, loving a private life with the constant care of her children and of her parents, who joined her in Edinburgh. Mrs. Ebsworth survived her husband thirteen years; all but three of her children died before her.

She returned to London in 1879, and died at Walworth, aged 87; she was buried on the 19th at West Norwood Cemetery.

References

1794 births
1881 deaths
19th-century English dramatists and playwrights
19th-century English women
Writers from London
Burials at West Norwood Cemetery
English women dramatists and playwrights
19th-century English women writers
19th-century English writers